Nandanar was a Nayanar saint in the Hindu sect of Shaivism. 

Nandanar may also refer to:

 Nandanar (author) (1926–1974), pseudonym of writer P. C. Gopalan
 Nandanar (1935 film)
 Nandanar (1942 film)